C-Myc-binding protein is a protein that in humans is encoded by the MYCBP gene.

Function 

The MYCBP gene encodes a protein that binds to the N-terminal region of MYC (MIM 190080) and stimulates the activation of E box-dependent transcription by MYC.[supplied by OMIM]

Interactions 

MYCBP has been shown to interact with AKAP1, C3orf15 and Myc.

References

Further reading